Pablo Garrido Lugo (born June 22, 1938) was a Mexican athlete who competed in the late 1960s. He finished 26th in the men's marathon at the 1968 Summer Olympics in Mexico City. Garrido also took the Olympic Oath at those same games. He was born in Jilotepec de Abasolo, State of Mexico.

References
1968 athletics marathon men's results
1968 Men's marathon results 
IOC 1968 Summer Olympics
Pablo Garrido's profile at Sports Reference.com

Athletes (track and field) at the 1968 Summer Olympics
Mexican male long-distance runners
Living people
1938 births
Olympic athletes of Mexico
Athletes from Mexico City
Oath takers at the Olympic Games
20th-century Mexican people